Justvik or Gjusvik is a village and district in the municipality of Kristiansand in Vest-Agder county, Norway. Its population (as of January 2014) is 2,770.  The village of Justvik is located on the west shore of the Topdalsfjorden, just north of the lake Gillsvannet.

Before the large municipal merger with Kristiansand in 1965, the Justvik area was part of the old municipality of Tveit, while the Justnes and Eidsbukta areas immediately to the south belonged to Oddernes municipality.

Justvik has both older housing and several housing estates which were built during the economic boom from the mid-1960s to the mid-1980s. Within the village is Justvik Church, Justvik School (for elementary and middle school students), sports facilities, and a grocery store.

There are several neighborhoods within the district of Justvik: Bleget, Greppestølåsen, Justneshalvøya, Justvik, Jærnesheia, and Kvernhusheia.

Politics 
The 10 largest political parties in Justvik as of the 2015 election:

Transportation

References

Villages in Vest-Agder
Populated places in Agder
Geography of Kristiansand